Lesbians and Gays Support the Miners (LGSM) was an alliance of lesbians and gay men who supported the National Union of Mineworkers during the year-long strike of 1984–1985. By the end of the strike, eleven LGSM groups had emerged in the UK and the London group alone raised £22,500 by 1985 in support.

History
During the strike, the Thatcher government sequestered the funds of the National Union of Mineworkers (NUM), meaning that it was pointless for supporters of the strike to send donations to the national union. Instead, support groups in Britain were encouraged to "twin" with the various mining communities in England, Scotland and Wales. Among these organisations, the LGSM was formed by Communist Party of Great Britain activist Mark Ashton and his friends, after they collected donations for the miners at the 1984 Lesbian and Gay Pride march in London. The London LGSM group met and fundraised in numerous locations, including the Gay's the Word bookshop. The group grew rapidly and moved out of Gay's The Word to a larger venue: The Fallen Angel, a gay pub in Graham Street, Islington. The London group was twinned with the Neath, Dulais and Swansea Valleys Miners Support Groups. In November 1984, a group of lesbians broke away from LGSM to form a separate group, Lesbians Against Pit Closures, although some lesbians remained active in the LGSM campaign rather than joining the women-only group.

In addition to raising approximately £22,500 for the families who were on strike, there were reciprocal visits. The largest fundraising event that LGSM organised was the "Pits and Perverts" benefit concert, which was held in the Electric Ballroom in Camden Town, London on 10 December 1984. The event was headlined by Bronski Beat and its lead singer, Jimmy Somerville. The title of the benefit is claimed by many to have originated as a headline in the British tabloid The Sun but this remains unproven.

Legacy 
The alliances which the campaign forged between the lesbian, gay, bisexual, and transgender (LGBT) community and British labour groups proved to be an important turning point in the progression of LGBT matters in the United Kingdom. Miners' labour groups began to support, endorse and participate in various gay pride events throughout the UK, including leading London's Lesbian and Gay Pride parade in 1985. At the 1985 Labour Party conference in Bournemouth, a resolution committing the party to the support of LGBT rights passed, due to block voting support from the National Union of Mineworkers. The miners' groups were also among the most outspoken allies of the LGBT community in the 1988 campaign against Section 28.

An archive of the London group's work is kept at the People's History Museum in Manchester. It includes the minutes of the weekly meetings, correspondence, press cuttings, publicity material, enamel badges, photographs and the group's banner. The London group's alliance with the Welsh mining village of Onllwyn is dramatised in the 2014 film, Pride, which was directed by Matthew Warchus. Several of the surviving group members participated in the film's promotion.

In 2015, following the film's release, the surviving members of the organisation held a 30th anniversary reunion to raise funds for the Mark Ashton Fund, an HIV/AIDS charitable fund administered by the Terrence Higgins Trust. The group was chosen to lead the 2015 Birmingham Pride parade, in recognition of their historic status. They were also slated to lead the 2015 Pride in London parade but withdrew in favour of marching further back after organisers refused to allow other affiliated groups, such as trade union contingents, to march with the LGSM. They also accepted invitations to 2015 Pride marches in Derry, Doncaster, Newcastle upon Tyne, Sunderland, Norwich, Liverpool Pride, Belfast and Leeds Pride.

LGSM announced on 9 October 2015 that they would "wind down as a current campaigning force", saying that they did not want to become "an LGBT version of the British Legion". The group elected four original core members to carry the legacy of the group onwards. These were Mike Jackson (Secretary), Dave Lewis (Press Officer), Martin Goodsell and Brett Haran (Treasurers). The remit of the four is to continue fundraising by selling merchandise (t-shirts, badges, the book Pride, etc.); respond to speaker requests; develop and maintain the website and to attend directly related mineworkers' legacy events such as the Durham Miners' Gala. The legacy group gained the approval of a substantial majority of the former members in supporting Jeremy Corbyn as Labour leader in August 2016.

Pride the book 
The group were approached in 2016 by UK publisher John Blake Books to produce a book about LGSM and they accepted. Author Tim Tate was chosen. He made extensive audio recordings of original members of LGSM and the mining families and activists they twinned with in South Wales. These verbatim interviews are woven together with the author's explanatory narrative. The book was published in 2017 by John Blake, it is available both in paperback and digital editions.

References

Bibliography

External links

 

1984 in LGBT history
1985 in LGBT history
LGBT history in the United Kingdom
Defunct LGBT organisations in the United Kingdom
LGBT socialism
LGBT working-class culture
UK miners' strike (1984–1985)